Mullae Station is an underground station on Seoul Subway Line 2. There is a 24-hour Home plus immediately outside Exit 4. It also serves various apartment complexes and factories. Close to Exit 7 is the street where some scenes in Avengers: Age of Ultron were filmed.

Station layout

References

Railway stations opened in 1984
Seoul Metropolitan Subway stations
Metro stations in Yeongdeungpo District
1984 establishments in South Korea
20th-century architecture in South Korea